Faces in the Crowd is a 2011 novel by Mexican author Valeria Luiselli,  originally under the title Los ingrávidos. Christina MacSweeney's English translation was published by Coffee House Press in 2014.

Background 
The novel chronicles three parallel yet intersecting narrative realities. The first narrative is set in Mexico City and follows a young mother writing a memoir of her bohemian days working as a translator of Mexican poetry in Harlem as her marriage begins to fall apart. 

The second narrative is set in Harlem, and follows the misadventures of a young translator who creates a deception while purporting to translate lost poems by the obscure, early 20th-century Mexican poet Gilberto Owen. 

The third narrative follows Gilberto Owen, the Mexican poet, and his friend, the Spanish poet, Federico García Lorca living in Philadelphia and New York City in the 1930s.

Reception 
The book has received acclaim for its unique reorientation of the invented spaces of language and identity.  It received the Los Angeles Times Art Seidenbaum Award for First Fiction.

References

2011 novels
Spanish-language novels
Mexican novels
Novels set in Mexico City
Novels set in New York City
Novels set in Philadelphia
Interpreting and translation in fiction
Coffee House Press books
2011 debut novels